Scrooge may refer to
 Ebenezer Scrooge, a character in Charles Dickens' 1843 novella A Christmas Carol
Scrooge, or, Marley's Ghost, a 1901 silent film
Scrooge (1913 film)
Scrooge (1935 film)
Scrooge (1951 film)
Scrooge (1970 film), a musical
Scrooge (musical), a 1992 stage musical
Scrooge: A Christmas Carol, a 2022 Netflix original film
Scrooge McDuck or Uncle Scrooge, a Disney comic and cartoon character
Uncle Scrooge, a comic book started in 1952 starring Scrooge McDuck
RT-20P (NATO reporting name: SS-15 Scrooge), an intercontinental ballistic missile developed by the Soviet Union

See also
 Miser
Scrooge McRock, a 1997 album by Grand Buffet
 Scrooged, a 1988 film starring Bill Murray